The La Loma Catholic Cemetery (Spanish: Campo Santo de La Loma) was opened in 1884 and is largely located in Caloocan, Metro Manila. A portion of the southern part of the cemetery is located in Manila.

It was opened in 1884 and was originally known as Cementerio de Binondo (Binondo Cemetery) as the area was then under the jurisdiction of Santa Cruz during the Spanish Colonial Period.

Spanish officials warned Filipino rebels that once they joined the uprising, they can no longer be buried in Catholic cemeteries on the consecrated ground like La Loma and thus denied of what then was considered a "decent" burial in their time of death.

During the early phases of the Philippine-American War, the cemetery's chapel was the focal point of the Battle of Caloocan. Gen. Arthur MacArthur and his forces occupied the chapel and Blockhouse 2, while Filipino forces under Gen. Antonio Luna were on the northern end of the cemetery. 

Campo Santo de La Loma is one of the few sites that escaped ruin during World War II in the 1945 Battle of Manila where most of the city's collection of architecture was destroyed. That leaves it as a crucial piece of the country's historical heritage of architecture. An anti-aircraft mortar launcher can even be seen in the cemetery grounds as well, that still stands today.

Notable burials
 Felipe Agoncillo (1859–1941), leader of junta to Hong Kong in 1898, now buried in the Santuario del Santo Cristo Cemetery
 Marcela Agoncillo (1860–1946), wife of Felipe and creator of the national flag of the Philippines, along with their daughter and Delfina Herbosa in Hong Kong, now buried in the Santuario del Santo Cristo Cemetery
 Maria Carpena (1886–1915), Filipina stage actress and soprano singer, also 1st Filipina recording artist.
 Lorenza Agoncillo (1890–1972), daughter of the principle seamstress of the first and official Philippine flag
 Carmelino G. Alvendia (1906–1982), a former justice of the Court of Appeals
 Cayetano Arellano (1847–1920), 1st Chief Justice of the Philippine Supreme Court
 BGen. Rafael Crame (1863-1927), 1st Chief of the Philippine Constabulary. Remains have been exhumed in August 7, 2003, and transferred to Libingan ng mga Bayani.
 Librada Avelino (1873–1934), founder of Centro Escolar University
 Brother Hyacinth Gabriel Connon (1911–1978) FSC, onetime president of the De La Salle University
 Felisa P. Dayrit (1876–1962), a revolutionary nurse
 Josefa Llanes Escoda (1898–1945), women's rights advocate and founder of the Girl Scouts of the Philippines; in an unmarked grave.
 Vicente Lava (1894–1947), Communist Leader before and during the Second World War
 Victorino Mapa (1855–1927), 2nd Chief Justice of the Philippine Supreme Court
 Pablo Ocampo (1853–1925), resident commissioner to the US Congress
 Josephus Stevenot (1888–1943), Founder of the Boy Scouts of the Philippines
 Ignacio Villamor (1863–1933), Delegate of Ilocos Sur at the Malolos Congress (1889); First Filipino President of the University of the Philippines (1915); Associate Justice of the Philippine Supreme Court (1918).
 Jaime C. de Veyra (1873–1963), former Resident Commissioner of the Philippines
 Tomas Mapua (1888–1965), 1st Registered Architect of the Philippines, founder of Mapua Institute of Technology
 Ricky Belmonte (1947–2001), actor and father of Sheryl Cruz.
 Maria Lorena Barros (1948–1976), founder of the Malayang Kilusan ng Bagong Kababaihan (Free Movement of New Women) (MAKIBAKA)
 Kian Loyd delos Santos (2000–2017), a senior high school student fatally shot by police officers conducting an Anti-drug operation in Caloocan.
 Pedro Adigue, Jr. (1943–2003), boxer
 Augusto Buenaventura (1929–2006), actor and director
 Angelo Buenaventura (1927–1996), actor
 Domingo Principe (1912–1990), actor
 Victor "Banahaw" Sevilla (1912–1975), actor
 Dr. Giovanni Calvo (1952–2001), actor and TV host
 Arsenia Francisco (1923–1971), actress
 Jose T. Padilla, III (1947–1994), actor
 Potenciano Gregorio (1880–1939), composer and musician
 Joaquín María Herrer y Rodríguez (1840–1917), Master Painter
 Max Laurel (1944–2016), actor

See also
 Manila North Cemetery
 Manila Chinese Cemetery
 Libingan ng mga Bayani
 Manila American Cemetery and Memorial

References

External links
 Cemeteries are a time capsule of RP history, culture

Cemeteries in Metro Manila
Roman Catholic cemeteries
Buildings and structures in Santa Cruz, Manila
Buildings and structures in Caloocan
Landmarks in the Philippines